Steroid sulfatase (STS), or steryl-sulfatase (EC 3.1.6.2), formerly known as arylsulfatase C, is a sulfatase enzyme involved in the metabolism of steroids. It is encoded by the STS gene.

Reactions
This enzyme catalyses the following chemical reaction

 3β-hydroxyandrost-5-en-17-one 3-sulfate + H2O  3β-hydroxyandrost-5-en-17-one + sulfate

Also acts on some related steryl sulfates.

Function 
The protein encoded by this gene catalyzes the conversion of sulfated steroid precursors to the free steroid. This includes DHEA sulfate, estrone sulfate, pregnenolone sulfate, and cholesterol sulfate, all to their unconjugated forms (DHEA, estrone, pregnenolone, and cholesterol, respectively). The encoded protein is found in the endoplasmic reticulum, where it is present as a homodimer.

Clinical significance
A congenital deficiency in the enzyme is associated with X-linked ichthyosis, a scaly-skin disease affecting roughly 1 in every 2,000 to 6,000 males. The excessive skin scaling and hyperkeratosis is caused by a lack of breakdown and thus accumulation of cholesterol sulfate, a steroid that stabilizes cell membranes and adds cohesion, in the outer layers of the skin.

Genetic deletions including STS are associated with an increased risk of developmental and mood disorders (and associated traits), and of atrial fibrillation or atrial flutter in males. Both steroid sulfatase deficiency and common genetic risk variants within STS may confer increased atrial fibrillation risk.

Steroid sulfates like DHEA sulfate and estrone sulfate serve as large biologically inert reservoirs for conversion into androgens and estrogens, respectively, and hence are of significance for androgen- and estrogen-dependent conditions like prostate cancer, breast cancer, endometriosis, and others. A number of clinical trials have been performed with inhibitors of the enzyme that have demonstrated clinical benefit, particularly in oncology and so far up to Phase II. The non-steroidal drug Irosustat has been the most studied to date.

Inhibitors
Inhibitors of STS include irosustat, estrone sulfamate (EMATE), estradiol sulfamate (E2MATE), and danazol. The most potent inhibitors are based around the aryl sulfamate pharmacophore and it is thought that such compounds irreversibly modify the active site formylglycine residue of steroid sulfatase.

Names
Steryl-sulfatase is also known as arylsulfatase, steroid sulfatase, sterol sulfatase, dehydroepiandrosterone sulfate sulfatase, arylsulfatase C, steroid 3-sulfatase, steroid sulfate sulfohydrolase, dehydroepiandrosterone sulfatase, pregnenolone sulfatase, phenolic steroid sulfatase, 3-beta-hydroxysteroid sulfate sulfatase, as well as by its systematic name steryl-sulfate sulfohydrolase.

See also 
 Steroidogenic enzyme
 Steroid sulfotransferase
 Estrogen sulfotransferase

References

Further reading

External links 
 

EC 3.1.6
Endocrinology